Discrete trial training (DTT) is a technique used by practitioners of applied behavior analysis (ABA) that was developed by Ivar Lovaas at the University of California, Los Angeles (UCLA). DTT uses direct instruction and reinforcers to create clear contingencies that shape new skills. Often employed as an early intensive behavioral intervention (EIBI) for up to 30–40 hours per week for children with autism, the technique relies on the use of prompts, modeling, and positive reinforcement strategies to facilitate the child's learning. It previously used aversives to punish unwanted behaviors. DTT has also been referred to as the "Lovaas/UCLA model", "rapid motor imitation antecedent", "listener responding", errorless learning", and "mass trials".

Technique
Discrete trial training (DTT) is a process whereby an activity is divided into smaller distinct sub-tasks and each of these is repeated continuously until a person is proficient. The trainer rewards successful completion and uses errorless correction procedures if there is unsuccessful completion by the subject to condition them into mastering the process. When proficiency is gained in each sub-task, they are re-combined into the whole activity: in this way proficiency at complex activities can be taught.

DTT is carried out in a one-on-one therapist to student ratio at the table. Intervention can start when a child is as young as two years old and can last from two to six years. Progression through goals of the program are determined individually and are not determined by which year the client has been in the program. The first year seeks to reduce self-stimulating ("stimming") behavior, teach listener responding, eye contact, and fine and gross motor imitation, as well as to establish playing with toys in their intended manner, and integrate the family into the treatment protocol. The second year teaches early expressive language and abstract linguistic skills. The third year strives to include the individual's community in the treatment to optimize "mainstreaming" by focusing on peer interaction, basic socializing skills, emotional expression and variation, in addition to observational learning and pre-academic skills, such as reading, writing, and arithmetic. Rarely is the technique implemented for the first time with adults.

DTT is typically performed five to seven days a week with each session lasting from five to eight hours, totaling an average of 30–40 hours per week. Sessions are divided into trials with intermittent breaks, and the therapist is positioned directly across the table from the student receiving treatment. Each trial is composed of the therapist giving an instruction (i.e., "Look at me", "Do this", "Point to", etc.), in reference to an object, color, simple imitative gesture, etc., which is followed by a prompt (verbal, gestural, physical, etc.). The concept is centered on shaping the child to respond correctly to the instructions throughout the trials. Should the child fail to respond to an instruction, the therapist uses either a "partial prompt" (a simple nudge or touch on the hand or arm) or a "full prompt" to facilitate the child to successfully complete the task. Correct responses are reinforced with a reward, and the prompts are discontinued as the child begins to master each skill.

The intervention is often used in conjunction with the Picture Exchange Communication System (PECS) as it primes the child for an easy transition between treatment types. The PECS program serves as another common intervention technique used to conform individuals with autism. As many as 25% of autistic individuals have no functional speech. The program teaches spontaneous social communication through symbols or pictures by relying on ABA techniques.  PECS operates on a similar premise to DTT in that it uses systematic chaining to teach the individual to pair the concept of expressive speech with an object.  It is structured in a similar fashion to DTT, in that each session begins with a preferred reinforcer survey to ascertain what would most motivate the child and effectively facilitate learning.

Effectiveness
Limited research shows DTT to be effective in enhancing communication, academic and adaptive skills, as many studies are of low quality research design and there needs to be more larger sample sizes.

Society and culture

In media 

A 1965 article in Life magazine entitled Screams, Slaps and Love has a lasting impact on public attitudes towards Lovaas's therapy. Giving little thought to how their work might be portrayed, Lovaas and parent advocate Bernie Rimland, M.D., were surprised when the magazine article appeared, since it focussed on text and selected images showing the use of aversives, including a close up of a child being slapped. Even after the use of aversives had been largely discontinued, the article continued to have an effect, galvanizing public concerns about behavior modification techniques.

United States cost 
In April 2002 treatment cost in the U.S. was about US$4,200 per month ($50,000 annually) per child.  The 20–40 hours per week intensity of the program, often conducted at home, may place additional stress on already challenged families.

Public opposition 
Organizations including the Autism National Committee (AutCom) have publicly stated their opposition to discrete trial training (DTT) and similar programs.

History
Discrete trial training is rooted in the hypothesis of Charles Ferster that autism was caused in part by a person's inability to react appropriately to "social reinforcers", such as praise or criticism. Lovaas's early work concentrated on showing that it was possible to strengthen autistic people's responses to these social reinforcers, but he found these improvements were not associated with any general improvement in overall behavior.

In a 1987 paper, psychologists Frank Gresham and Donald MacMillan described a number of weaknesses in Lovass's research and judged that it would be better to call the evidence for his interventions "promising" rather than "compelling".

Lovaas's original technique used aversives such as striking, shouting, and electrical shocks to punish undesired behaviors. By 1979, Lovaas had abandoned the use of aversives, and in 2012 the use of electric shocks was described as being inconsistent with contemporary practice. In 1985, Massachusetts medical authorities intervened after a case of fatal starvation at the Judge Rotenberg Center in which a 19-year-old woman was denied food by staff as a punishment.

See also
 Professional practice of behavior analysis

References

External links
Lovaas Institute for Early Intervention

Treatment of autism
Behaviorism
Behavior modification